William Higgins (15 November 1888 – 3 July 1968) was a New Zealand cricketer. He played seven first-class matches for Otago between 1910 and 1921.

See also
 List of Otago representative cricketers

References

External links
 

1888 births
1968 deaths
New Zealand cricketers
Otago cricketers
Cricketers from Dunedin